Beal is a village and civil parish in the District of Selby in North Yorkshire, England. The parish includes the village of Kellingley, and borders the City of Wakefield in West Yorkshire. At the 2001 census it had a population of 720, increasing to 738 at the 2011 census.

Overview

The name "Beal" is of Old English origins and means "Nook of land in a river-bend". It is composed of the elements bēag ("river-bend") and halh ("nook of land"). The village was recorded as Begale in the Domesday Book of 1086.

Kellingley Colliery, the last operating deep coal mine in the United Kingdom, was located in the parish until its closure in December 2015.

Fishing on the River Aire is controlled by Leeds and District Amalgamated Society of Anglers.  The main catches are roach and bream.

Bus service 476 operated by Arriva Yorkshire, connects the village with Pontefract, Ferrybridge, Knottingley, Kellingley, Beal, Kellington, Eggborough, Burn, Brayton and Selby.

Governance
The village of Beal was a township in the ancient parish of Kellington in the wapentake of Osgoldcross and liberty of Pontefract in the West Riding of Yorkshire. It became a separate parish in 1866, and was incorporated into Pontefract poor law union in 1869. In 1875, the area of the poor law union became a rural sanitary district, which in 1894 was superseded by Pontefract Rural District. The rural district was abolished in 1938, and Beal became part of Osgoldcross Rural District, which was itself abolished under local government reorganisation in 1974, with the eastern part incorporated into the District of Selby in the new county of North Yorkshire.

Nigel Adams has been the member of parliament for Selby and Ainsty since the constituency was created in 2010; he represents the Conservative Party. In 2009 an Independent, John McCartney, was elected for  the North Yorkshire County Council seat of Osgoldcross. At the 2011 Selby District Councillocal elections, Gillian Ivey and Susan Ryder, both Conservatives, were elected; six Independent councillors were elected unopposed to the parish council.

References

External links

 A Vision of Britain Through Time
 Genuki
 Geograph
 Office for National Statistics

Civil parishes in North Yorkshire
Selby District
Villages in North Yorkshire